Bobbellapadu is a village in Krishna district of the Indian state of Andhra Pradesh. It is located in Chandarlapadu mandal of Vijayawada revenue division. It is a part of Andhra Pradesh Capital Region.

Demographics 
It has approximately 1261 residents in approximately 362 households. It has pincode 521182.

Inscriptions

 1520 C. E.
 1548 C. E.

References

Villages in Krishna district